Arvind Limited (formerly Arvind Mills) is a textile manufacturer and the flagship company of the Lalbhai Group. Its headquarters  are in Naroda, Ahmedabad, Gujarat, India, and it has units at Santej (near Kalol). The company manufactures cotton shirting, denim, knits and bottomweight (khaki) fabrics. It has also recently ventured into technical textiles when it started Advanced Materials Division in 2011. It is India's largest denim manufacturer.

Sanjaybhai Lalbhai is the current Chairman and managing director of Arvind and Lalbhai Group. In the early 1980s, he led the 'Reno-vision' whereby the company brought denim into the domestic market, thus starting the jeans revolution in India. Today it retails its own brands like Flying Machine, Newport and Excalibur and licensed international brands like Arrow, Tommy Hilfiger, and Calvin Klein through its nationwide retail network. Arvind also runs three clothing and accessories retail chains, the Arvind Store, Unlimited and Megamart, which stocks company brands.

History and operations
 1897: Arvind Mills starts a business for sarees.
 1931: Arvind Mills Ltd is incorporated by three brothers Kasturbhai, Narottambhai and Chimanbhai. with a share capital of ₹165,000 ($2500) in Ahmedabad. The products manufactured are dhoties, sarees, mulls, dorias, crepes, shirtings, lingerie, coatings, printed lawns and voiles cambrics, twills and gaberdine.
 1934: Becomes established as the foremost textile units in the country.
 1985: Diversified into electronics by setting up a plant to manufacture electronic telephone exchanges (EPABX) and also entering into marketing pharmaceutical products and B&W and colour television sets under the name Pyramid.
 1986: Becomes first company in India bring globally accepted fabrics such as Denim yarn dyed shirting fabrics & wrinkle free gabardines.
 1987: The company takes up a modernisation program to triple the production of denim cloth and to produce double yarn fabrics for exports. The new product groups identified are: indigo dyed blue denim and high quality two-ply fabrics for exports, and products such as butta sarees, full voiles and dhoties. Also started retail outlets for 'Arrow' brand and became the first company in India to bring international shirt brand 'Arrow'.
 1991: Arvind reaches 100  million meters of denim per year, becoming the fourth-largest producer of denim in the world.
 1992: The company increases production of denim cloth by 23,000 tonnes per day by modernising the plant at Khatraj of Ankur Textiles.
 1994: The company's operations are divided into textile, telecom and garments divisions.
 1995: The garment division launches ready to stitch jeans pack under the brand Ruf & Tuf.
 1997: The marketing and distribution network of the Newport brand is strengthened and the relaunched Flying Machine and Ruggers brands were strengthened.
 Arvind Mills sets up an anti-piracy cell for the first time in India to curb large scale counterfeiting of their brands Ruf & Tuf and Newport jeans.
 Arvind Mills adopts the franchisee system for manufacturing and distribution of Ruf & Tuf jeans.
 Arvind Fashions doubles capacity at the Bangalore manufacturing facility to produce Lee jeans.
 1998: Arvind Mills emerges as the world's third largest manufacturer of denim.
 Arvind Mills goes live with SAP R/3 ERP package in April 1997 in their new manufacturing units.
 2001 (February): company increases the number of Spindles and Stitching Machines by 2036 Nos and 38 Nos respectively.
 2003: For the fourth quarter, Arvind Mills saw a 280% growth in net profit.
 Arvind Mills Ltd is assigned a "P1+" rating by CRISIL, which indicates a very strong rating for their commercial paper.
 Increases the number of Stitching machines by 7 Nos.
 2004: Expanded their shirts manufacturing capacity from 2.4 million pieces to 4.8 million pieces per annum. Its subsidiary company Arvind Spinning Ltd commences its operation.
 2005: For the fourth quarter in a row, Arvind Mills posts a profit growth in excess of 80%.
 Arvind Mills buys the entire stake in Arvind Brands from ICICI Ventures.
 commenced their operations of producing Jeans Pant in Bangalore with the installed capacity of 4 million Pcs per annum from March.
 2006: New Denim collection was launched aimed at Super Premium brands of US, Europe, Japan and Korea. Also opened new venues for the Denim division as response to this collection was good.
 April: Demerge and transfer of the Garments Business Division to their 100% subsidiary company Arvind Brands Ltd and amalgamating Arvind Fashions Ltd a 100% subsidiary of Arvind Brands Ltd with Arvind Mills. Joint venture with company Arvind Murjani Brand Pvt Ltd through which they hold license to sell Tommy Hilfiger brand apparel in India.
 August: Wholesale branded apparel business of Arvind Fashions Ltd sold to VF Arvind Brands Pvt Ltd.
2007: Arvind expands its presence in the retail segment by establishing MegaMart, one of India's largest value retail chains.
2008: From March, company signs an exclusive license agreement with Philips-Van Heusen Corporation (PVH) for designing, distribution and retailing of IZOD brand apparels in India.
 May: Company's name changed from Arvind Mills Ltd to Arvind Ltd to accurately reflect the multi-faceted nature of the organization.
2010: Arvind launches "Arvind Store", a concept showcasing the company's best fabrics, brands and bespoke styling and tailoring solutions under one roof. 
 September: Sets up a 30 million meters of denim manufacturing plant in Bangladesh with a total investment of $60 million in joint venture with Nitol group where the latter will have 20% stake in the joint venture company.
 Arvind launches its first major real estate project.
 Arvind becomes one of India's largest producers of fire protection fabrics.
 2011 (November): Arvind announced that it has divested its minority stake of 40% in VF Arvind Brands Private Limited (VFABPL),which is engaged in marketing products under the brands Lee and Wrangler and was formed in September 2006 with 60:40 shareholding between VF Mauritius and Arvind, to VF Mauritius for 257 crore. Arvind share in the Joint Venture was 5.47 crore as the capital of the joint venture company.
 2012: joint venture with PD Group, Germany, for manufacturing glass fabrics.
September:  Arvind's subsidiary Arvind Lifestyle Brands acquired the business operations of British fashion retailers Debenhams and Next and American Lifestyle brand Nautica in India from Planet Retail marking the entry of Arvind into the Bridge to Luxury Department Store Segment and also entering into the fast growing segment of apparel specialty retail through Next stores. The licensing agreement with Nautica consolidates company's already strong position in high potential sportswear segment.
 2014: joint venture with PVH for Calvin Klein Businesses in India.
 Launches formal suits with Goodhill Corporation Limited of Japan.
 Arvind Envisol, a subsidiary of the company providing waste water treatment solutions acquired a global patent for its Polymeric Film Evaporation Technology (PFET) as this revolutionary technology helps it to save 80% energy cost for Envisol's Zero Liquid Discharge water treatment system.
 2014: joint venture with OG Corp, Japan, for manufacturing and sale of non-woven fabrics, the project being spearheaded by Dr. Kunal Shah.
 2014: forays into the E-commerce segment with custom clothing brand Creyate, offering fine bespoke menswear with a degree of customisation rarely found.
 2014: The company publishes its first Sustainability Report, 'Fundamentally Right'.
 2015: partnered with USA-headquartered Invista, owner of the Lycra fibre brand to manufacture stretch denim fabric in India.
 Company launches denim fabric Khadi Denim.
 Collaborates with world's largest internet giant and most renowned denim brand and launches wearable denim technology and smart denim jackets.
 Launches a 4-in-1 smart shirt in association with Arrow.
 2016: The company enters online retailing with NNNow.com, a one-stop shopping destination for trendsetters across India.
 2016: GAP joins hands with Arvind to sell apparels through NNNow.com
 2016: Arvind Fashion Brands ties up with cricket legend Sachin Tendulkar and launches True Blue, a menswear label that embodies the spirit of the global Indian.
 2016 (October) announces decision to generate about 740 crores by diluting 10% stake in its brand business arm pegging its enterprise value at 8,000 crore and same will be picked up by Multiples, the Private Equity firm founded by Renuka Ramnath.
 2017: Launches its own Ready-To-Wear brand.
 October:  signs a Memorandum of Understanding (MoU) with the Gujarat state government to establish a mega apparel factory in the state, a 300 crore project in Dahegam with capacity to produce over 24 million garments once fully operational.
 November: India's largest textile and branded apparel player announces decision to demerge its Branded Apparel and Engineering businesses from the parent company, into the entity Arvind Fashions Limited and the shareholders of Arvind Limited will be entitled for one equity share of Arvind Fashions Limited for every five shares held by them in parent company. Engineering business will be demerged into an entity named as Anup Engineering and will be engaged in the manufacturing of critical process equipment and Shareholders of Arvind Limited will be entitled for 1 equity shares of Anup Engineering Limited for 27 shares held by them in parent company. Both the companies are planned to be listed on BSE and NSE on completion of process.
 2018 (March): Adient (NYSE: ADNT), announced the formation of Adient Arvind Automotive Fabrics a joint venture with Arvind Limited for development, manufacture and sale of automotive fabrics in India and the new company will be based in Ahmedabad, India, and will manufacture fabrics for automotive seating at a fabric manufacturing facility.

Gallery

Businesses
 Fabric
 Denim
 Shirtings
 Khakis
 Knitwear
 Voile
 Garment exports
 Shirts
 Jeans
 Arvind Brands (owned)
 Flying Machine (company)
 Newport
 Quads
 Ruf & Tuf
 Excalibur
 Creyate
 Arvind RTW (Exclusively available at The Arvind Stores)
 Arvind Brands (licensed)
 Arrow
 Gap Inc.
 Gant U.S.A.
 Tommy Hilfiger
 EdHardy
 Izod
 Cherokee
 Mossimo
 U.S. Polo Assn.
 Nautica
 Aeropostale
 Advanced Materials Division
 EBO (exclusive brand outlet) / The Arvind Store 
 Agri
 Telecommunications service provider
 Engineering
 Internet
 Real estate
 Mega Mart Retail
 Environmental Solutions

Financial restructuring
In the mid-1990s, the company undertook a massive expansion of its denim capacity even though other cotton fabrics were slowly replacing the demand for denim. The expansion plan was funded by loans from both Indian and overseas financial institutions. With the demand for denim slowing, the company found it difficult to repay the loans, resulting in an increased interest burden on the loans. In the late 1990s, the company encountered financial problems due of its debt burden, resulting in incurring significant losses.

The company came up with a debt-restructuring plan for the long-term debts being taken up in February 2001. This complex financial restructuring exercise, which involved several domestic and international lenders, is considered to be the benchmark and a case study in India. The restructuring was overseen by Jayesh Shah, CFO, and advised on by a JP Morgan Hong Kong team, led by Ahmad Ayaz.

In 2018, Arvind Ltd. demerged its branded apparel and engineering business into separate entities for enhanced focus and value addition for the shareholders of the Company. It got the nod from NCLT Ahmedabad bench for demerger in Oct 2018. Arvind Fashions, the branded apparel entity, will be scaling up existing brand portfolio and improve profitability across brands. Anveshan Heavy Engineering, earlier known as Anup Engineering, has laid down capex plans of ₹80 crore to double existing fabrication capacity of 15,000 tonnes per annum by implementing product mix. Out of the planned investment, ₹40 crore has already been invested.

See also
 Kasturbhai Lalbhai

References

External links
 Economics Times News About Arvind
 Business Standard | Arvind Company History 

Companies listed on the National Stock Exchange of India
Indian companies established in 1931
Lalbhai family
Lalbhai Group
Manufacturing companies based in Ahmedabad
Manufacturing companies established in 1931
Textile companies of India
Textile industry in Gujarat
Companies listed on the Bombay Stock Exchange